Here is a list of all of KF Tirana's Cup seasons from 1939 till end of most recent season. This list shows where they finished the season, how many ties won or lost, how many goals they scored and conceded, how many wins draws and losses they had throughout the season, goal difference, winning difference and number of matches played.

Albanian Cup Performance Table

 Appearances:              70 Seasons
 Winners:         16 Times
 Runners-up:               10 Times
 Semi Finals:              36 Times
 Quarter Finals:           55 Times
 Ties Won:      194 Times
 Ties Lost:                53 Times

 Data missing from few of Cup seasons, thus the correct total figures in bold differ from some of added sums on the table above.

All Finals results

Head-to-head

 Data missing from few of Cup seasons, thus the correct total figures in bold differ from some of added sums on the table above.
 Last updated: 70th Cup

Recent seasons

Also look

KF Tirana Statistics in Albanian Superliga

References

KF Tirana